Turcica caffea, common name the two tooth top shell, is a species of sea snail, a marine gastropod mollusk in the family Eucyclidae.

Description
The height of the shell attains 20 mm.

References

External links
 To Biodiversity Heritage Library (13 publications)
 To Encyclopedia of Life
 To ITIS
 To World Register of Marine Species
 

caffea
Gastropods described in 1865